Mihail Valchev (born 13 October 1956) is a former Bulgarian footballer who played as a forward. In his career he played mostly for Akademik Sofia and Levski Sofia.

Career
In 1979 Valchev joined Akademik Sofia, where he scored 38 goals for two seasons. In 1981 he left to join Levski Sofia, where he won two Bulgarian League titles, two Bulgarian Cups and one Cup of the Soviet Army. Valchev had a successful start to his career at the club by being the league's top goalscorer in its inaugural season, scoring 24 goals. Between 1981 and 1986 he scored 109 goals in 177 matches for the club in all competitions.

In March 1998, Valchev was appointed Levski Sofia manager and led the team to a famous 5–0 win over city rivals CSKA Sofia in the 1998 Bulgarian Cup Final. As a manager, he has worked also for Kremikovtsi Sofia, Rilski Sportist Samokov, Chernomorets Burgas, Levski Dolna Banya and Belasitsa Petrich.

Honours

Player
Levski Sofia
 Bulgarian League (2): 1983–84, 1984–85
 Bulgarian Cup (2): 1983–84, 1985–86
 Cup of the Soviet Army: 1983–84

Manager
Levski Sofia
 Bulgarian Cup: 1997–98

Individual
 Bulgarian League Top Scorer: 1982 (with 24 goals)

References

 Profile at LevskiSofia.info

1956 births
People from Varna Province
Living people
Bulgarian footballers
Bulgaria international footballers
Bulgarian football managers
Akademik Sofia players
PFC Levski Sofia players
FC Lokomotiv 1929 Sofia players
First Professional Football League (Bulgaria) players
Bulgarian expatriate footballers
Expatriate footballers in Greece
PFC Levski Sofia managers
Association football forwards